Crosscurrent is a novel by Paul S. Kemp that was released in January 2010. It takes place during the Great Hyperspace War as well as after the Legacy of the Force series and features Jaden Korr as a lead character. It also ties in to Lost Tribe of the Sith: Precipice.

Story
In 5000 BBY, the Sith Lord Saes Rrogan gathers up a Force-enhancing mineral from a world that his Sith fleet destroyed. On his heels are Jedi Master Relin Druur and his Padawan Drev Hassin. When they attempt to board Rrogan's ship, the Harbinger, Drev is killed, but Relin makes it aboard, killing and wounding several of Rrogan's subordinates before confronting the Sith himself. They have a brief duel which both escape severely wounded, and Relin manages to sabotage the hyperdrive core of the Harbinger in order to mess up its trajectory in returning with the rest of the Sith. This throws off the trajectory of the Harbinger'''s sister ship, the Omen, which would have it crash land irreparably on the out-of-place world of Kesh. As for the Harbinger itself, its hyperdrive sabotage drives it more than 5000 years into the future, specifically in 41 ABY.

In that time period, Jedi Knight Jaden Korr senses a disturbance in the Force emanating from the Unknown Regions. He travels there and lands on the world of Fhost, where he seeks the help of junk dealers Khedryn Faal and Marr Idi-Shael. They take him to a nameless moon where Jaden had felt the disturbance in the Force. They soon run into the Harbinger that had finally come out of hyperspace after more than 5000 years. They ally with Relin Druur to combat Saes Rrogan's forces even as those from the past realize in what time they're now in. Eventually, as Relin gathers the help of Marr to destroy the Harbinger, Jaden teams up with Khedryn to explore the mysterious moon. While all this happens, Jaden is being stalked by Kell Douro, an Anzati who drains people's lives away, and finds Jaden to be a delicious meal.

On the moon, Jaden and Khedryn find a dead and deserted base. The two of them get separated, and Khedryn is nearly killed by Douro. But Douro decides not to quench his appetite with Khedryn, and remains ever-vigilant to consume Jaden's life. Jaden, meanwhile, finds the source of the dark side in the form of a deranged clone of Jedi Master Kam Solusar. Though Jaden loses most of his fingers in one hand, he kills the clone in combat, but is nearly killed by Douro. Douro, however, is killed himself when Khedryn shoots his brains out at point-blank range with his blaster. Despite the victory against the clone and Douro, Jaden senses through the Force that other deranged clones of other Force-users in the base have managed to escape. This is confirmed when Jaden and Khedryn see a ship fly away from the outside of the base.

Aboard the Harbinger, Marr helps Relin with his mission as best he can, then escapes while Relin confronts Saes in one final battle. Relin kills Rrogan, and then uses the Force-enhancing minerals around him to completely destroy the Harbinger. With that, Jaden, Khedryn, and Marr all decide to follow the escaping clones.

Characters
 Jaden Korr (male human)
 Kell Douro (male Anzati)
 Khedryn Faal (male human)
 Marr Idi-Shael (male Cerean)
 Relin Druur (male human)
 Saes Rrogon (male Kaleesh)
 Drev Hassin (male Askajian)
 Alpha (male human)
 Kam Solusar (male human) (appears in vision only)
 Mara Jade Skwyalker (female human) (appears in vision only)
 Lumiya (female human) (appears in vision only)
 Luke Skywalker (male human) (mentioned only)
 Darth Caedus (male human) (mentioned only)
 Palpatine (male human) (mentioned only)
 Kyle Katarn (male human) (mentioned only)
 Darth Bane (male human) (mentioned only)
 Darth Wyyrlok (I) (male Chagrian)
 Darth Krayt (male human) (mentioned only)

ReceptionCrosscurrent reached 10 on the New York Times bestseller list on February 14, 2010.

Sequel
A sequel by Kemp, titled Riptide'', followed on October 25, 2011.

References

External links
 Official Starwars.com Listing

2010 Canadian novels
2010 science fiction novels
Star Wars Legends novels
Canadian science fiction novels
Del Rey books

pt:Darth Bane: A Regra de Dois